The Nullifier Party was an American political party based in South Carolina in the 1830s. Considered an early American third party, it was started by John C. Calhoun in  1828.

The Nullifier Party was a states' rights, pro-slavery party that supported strict constructionism with regards to the U.S. government's enumerated powers, holding that states could nullify federal laws within their borders. It narrowly missed claiming the unofficial title of being the first ever third party to be created within the United States—that title belongs to the Anti-Masonic Party, which was created in New York in February 1828. The Nullifier Party had several members in both houses of the Congress between 1831 and 1839. Calhoun outlined the principles of the party in his South Carolina Exposition and Protest (1828), a reaction to the "Tariff of Abominations" passed by Congress and signed into law by President John Quincy Adams. (A similar position had been staked out by the Kentucky and Virginia Resolutions thirty years prior, though those Resolutions had stopped short of actually advocating nullification.) 

The Nullifier Party operated almost exclusively in South Carolina. It stood in strong opposition to President Andrew Jackson. John Floyd was supported by the Nullifier Party in the 1832 presidential election, and he received South Carolina's 11 votes in the electoral college. Floyd was not a candidate and had himself unsuccessfully tried to convince Calhoun to run for President. The party's candidate for Vice President was the Massachusetts-based political economist . Some Nullifiers joined the newly formed Whig Party after the 1832 election, attracted by its opposition to Jackson and its depiction of Jackson as a monarch. After President Andrew Jackson left office, Calhoun and most of his followers rejoined the Democratic Party.

Notable members 
 John C. Calhoun
 Robert Y. Hayne
 John Floyd
 Stephen D. Miller
 James H. Hammond
 William C. Preston
 Henry L. Pinckney
 Robert B. Campbell
 William K. Clowney
 Warren R. Davis
 John Myers Felder
 John K. Griffin
 Francis Wilkinson Pickens
 George McDuffie
 Franklin H. Elmore

Electoral history

Presidential elections

Congressional elections

See also 
 Nullification Crisis

References 

Defunct political parties in the United States
Political parties established in 1828
Political parties in South Carolina
History of South Carolina
John C. Calhoun
Nullification (U.S. Constitution)
Kentucky and Virginia Resolutions
1839 disestablishments in South Carolina
1828 establishments in South Carolina
Political parties disestablished in 1839
Factions in the Democratic Party (United States)
Political parties in the United States
Defunct conservative parties in the United States
Conservatism in the United States